Sir Walter Minto Townsend-Farquhar, 2nd Baronet (26 October 1809 – 18 June 1866), also spelt Townshend-Farquhar, was a British Conservative Party politician.

He was the son of Robert Townsend Farquhar and Maria Frances Geslip de Latour. In 1835, he married Erica Catherine Mackay, daughter of Eric Mackay, 7th Lord Reay, and together they had five children:
 Eric Townsend-Farquhar (1836–1867)
 Minto Townsend-Farquhar (1837–1872)
 John Townsend-Farquhar (1839–1877)
 Robert Townsend-Farquhar (1841–1924)
 Horace Farquhar (1844–1923)

He became Baronet of Mauritius upon his father's death in 1830. When he died, the title passed to his first son, Eric.

Townsend-Farquhar was elected MP for Hertford in 1857 and held the seat until his death in 1866.

References

External links
 

Conservative Party (UK) MPs for English constituencies
Baronets in the Baronetage of the United Kingdom
Deputy Lieutenants of Middlesex
UK MPs 1865–1868
1809 births
1866 deaths